Scott Lipsky and Leander Paes were the defending champions but chose not to defend their title.

Robert Galloway and Denis Kudla won the title after defeating Enrique López Pérez and Jeevan Nedunchezhiyan 6–3, 6–1 in the final.

Seeds

Draw

References
 Main Draw
 Qualifying Draw

Tallahassee Tennis Challenger - Doubles
2018 Doubles